Martial Solal (born August 23, 1927) is a French jazz pianist and composer.

Biography
Solal was born in Algiers, French Algeria, to Algerian Jewish parents. He was persuaded to study clarinet, saxophone, and piano by his mother, who was an opera singer. He was expelled from school in 1942 because of his parents' Jewish ancestry. Algeria was a French colony, and the Vichy regime in France was following Nazi policies. Solal educated himself after having studied classical music in school. He imitated music he heard on the radio. When he was 15, he performed publicly for United States Army audiences.

After settling in Paris in 1950, he began working with Django Reinhardt and U.S. expatriates such as Sidney Bechet and Don Byas. He formed a quartet (occasionally also leading a big band) in the late 1950s, although he had been recording as a leader since 1953. Solal then began composing film music, eventually providing over 20 scores. He composed music for Jean-Luc Godard's debut feature film Breathless (À bout de souffle, 1960).

In 1963, he made an appearance at the Newport Jazz Festival in Rhode Island; the Newport '63 album purporting to be a recording of this gig is actually a studio recreation with overdubbed applause, as documented in the sleeve notes of some later reissues. At this time, his trio included bassist Guy Pedersen and drummer Daniel Humair. From 1968, he performed and recorded with Lee Konitz in Europe and the U.S.

In its January 2011 issue, The Gruppen Review published a 12-page interview in which Solal discusses his work as an eternal "researcher in jazz".

Style

His jazz approach was once described by Jean-Pierre Thiollet as "brilliant, unique and intellectual" He has said of his technique: "You have to make people believe that it's very easy, even when it's very difficult. If you look to have trouble with the technique, it is no good. You must play the most difficult thing like this."

Discography

Leader 
 1954 French Modern Sounds (Swing/Disques Vogue)
 1954 Martial Solal Trio  (Disques Vogue)
 1959  (Columbia)
 1961 Martial Solal (Vogue)
 1962 The Martial Solal Trio in Concert (Columbia [EMI])
 1962  (Columbia); US release as In Concert/Trio in Concert (Liberty, 1963)
 1962  (Pathé-Marconi)
 1963  (RCA)
 1964  (Columbia)
 1965 Martial Solal Trio (Columbia)
 1965 Son 66 (Columbia)
 1970 Locomotion (with Henry Texier and Bernard Lubat)
 1970  (RCA Victor)
 1975 7 + 4 = X (PDU)
 1975 Nothing but Piano (MPS)
 1978 Suite for Trio (Universal)
 1981 Big Band (Universal)
 1983 Bluesine (Soul Note)
 1984 Big Band (BMG/Dreyfus)
 1984 Plays Hodeir (OMDCD)
 1991 Triptyque (Adda)
 1991 Duo in Paris (BMG/Dreyfus)
 1995  (JMS)
 1996 Difficult Blues (John Marks Records)
 1997  (Dreyfus)
 1998 Silent Cinema – Cinema Muet (Gorgone)
 1998 Martial Solal, Vol. 2 (Vogue)
 1999  (Soul Note)
 1999 En Solo (Fresh Sound)
 1999  (Storyville)
 2000  (Dreyfus)
 2003  (Blue Note)
 2007  (Nocturne)
 2007  (CAM Jazz)
 2008  (CAM Jazz)
 2009  (CAM Jazz)
 2015  (Grand Piano)
 2018  (JMS)
 2018  (Intuition Records)
 2021  (Challenge records)

Co-leader 
 1957 When a Soprano Meets a Piano with Sidney Bechet (Inner City)
 1968 European Episode with Lee Konitz  (Campi)
 1968 Impressive Rome with Lee Konitz (Campi)
 1968  (Ducretet Thomson)
 1976  with Niels-Henning Ørsted Pedersen (MPS)
 1977 Duplicity with Lee Konitz (Horo)
 1979 Four Keys (MPS)
 1980 Live at the Berlin Jazz Days 1980  with Lee Konitz (MPS)
 1980  with Stéphane Grappelli (Sunnyside)
 1983 Star Eyes, Hamburg 1983 with Lee Konitz (HatOLOGY)
 1988  (Label Bleu)
 1992 Martial Solal & Toots Thielemans (Erato)
 1999  with Michel Portal (BMG France)
 2000  with Johnny Griffin (Dreyfus)
 2000  with Éric Le Lann (Nocturne, H&L)
 2006  with Dave Douglas (CAM Jazz)
 2017 , with Dave Liebman (Sunnyside)
 2020 , with Dave Liebman (Sunnyside)

 Sideman 
 1974 Jazz à Juan (SteepleChase)
 2005 Comptines Pour Enfants Seulement'' (Doumtak)

References

External links
 A Portrait of Martial Solal: Verbunkos. Retrieved February 9, 2013
 
 Martial Solal unreleased recordings, including Robert Kaddouch - Gruppen review
 Martial Solal recording at Murecstudio Milan murec studio la storia

1927 births
Living people
French film score composers
French male film score composers
French jazz pianists
French male pianists
Algerian Jews
Pausa Records artists
Musicians from Algiers
Bebop pianists
Post-bop pianists
21st-century pianists
21st-century French male musicians
French male jazz musicians
21st-century Algerian people